Longoni SRL is one of the most prominent European manufacturers of high-end cue sticks. The company, founded by Alessandro Longoni in 1945, is based in Mariano Comense, Italy.  Longoni makes cues customized for various carom billiards disciplines, including three-cushion, five-pin, and artistic billiards, as well as pool and Russian pyramid cues more recently.

Over the years, several professional players, including Dick Jaspers and Niels Feijen, have helped design and develop new lines of Longoni carom and pool cues, respectively.  As of 2014, Niels Feijen is still under contract with Longoni.

A hallmark of Longoni cues is their often unusual  designs – including octagonal cuts, sewn-in leather strips, and intricate inlay ornaments.  Longoni's two top lines of pool cues, the Classica and Silver series, range from approximately US$1,500 to $6,000.

Longoni supports no-ivory cue production by exclusively using  made of phenolic resin.

References

External links
 Longoni company English-language website (an alternate interface is available here)

Cue sports equipment manufacturers
Sporting goods manufacturers of Italy
Italian brands